Ev or EV may refer to:

Businesses
 Electro-Voice, a United States manufacturer of amplifiers, microphones, other audio equipment and speakers
 Expressjet Airlines (IATA designator)
 Atlantic Southeast Airlines (IATA designator)

In economics
 Embedded value, the present value of future profits for a life insurance company
 Enterprise value, an economic measure reflecting the market value of a whole business
 Equivalent variation, a measure of how much more money a consumer would pay before a price increase to avert the price increase

People
 Ev (given name)

Science, technology, and mathematics
 Electric vehicle, a vehicle using an electric motor instead of an internal combustion engine
Electric car, a type of electric vehicle
Electronvolt (eV), in physics, a unit of energy
 Estradiol valerate, an estrogen medication
 Evolution-Data Optimized, a telecommunications standard for the wireless transmission of data through radio signals
 Expected value, the mean of a random variable's probability distribution
 Exposure value, a combination of shutter speed and aperture in photography
 Extended Validation Certificate, a type of X.509 Certificate used in securing computer communications
 Extracellular vesicle, a membrane-bound vesicle
 Stereo-4, also known as EV (Electro-Voice), a quadraphonic sound system developed in 1970
 Exploration vessel (E/V), a type of marine vessel

Other uses
 Land of Ev, a fictional country in the Oz books of L. Frank Baum and his successors
 , Estonian for Republic of Estonia
  ('registered association'), a legal status for a registered voluntary association in Germany and Austria
 Enterprise Village, an educational program co-managed by the Stavros Institute in Pinellas County, Florida
 , pseudo-Latin for the Common Era
 EuroVelo, a network of long-distance cycling routes in Europe

See also

 
 
 EV1 (disambiguation)
 EVS (disambiguation)
 VE (disambiguation)
 V (disambiguation)
 E (disambiguation)